Sprott is an unincorporated community located in Union Township in Sainte Genevieve County, Missouri, United States. Sprott is located approximately nineteen miles southwest of Sainte Genevieve.

A post office called Sprott was established in 1902, and remained in operation until 1918. The town was named after John Sprott, a local merchant.

References 

Unincorporated communities in Ste. Genevieve County, Missouri
Unincorporated communities in Missouri